Junki Goryo (五領 淳樹, born December 13, 1989) is a Japanese football player for Kagoshima United FC.

Club statistics
Updated to 23 February 2018.

References

External links

Profile at Kagoshima United FC

1989 births
Living people
Miyazaki Sangyo-keiei University alumni
Association football people from Kagoshima Prefecture
Japanese footballers
J2 League players
J3 League players
Japan Football League players
Roasso Kumamoto players
Kagoshima United FC players
Association football midfielders